Sir Richard Thorn Pease, 3rd Baronet, DL (20 May 1922 – 9 March 2021) was a British banker, who was chairman of Yorkshire Bank, and vice-chairman of Barclays.

Early life
Pease was born in May 1922, the son of Sir Richard Arthur Pease (1890–1969), the 2nd Baronet, and the grandson of Sir Arthur Pease, 1st Baronet (1866–1927). He was educated at Eton College.

His elder brother Arthur Peter Pease was an RAF Flying Officer who was killed in action on 15 September 1940, aged just 22, during the Battle of Britain, when his Spitfire was shot down near Kingswood, in Kent.

Career
Pease was chairman of Yorkshire Bank, and vice-chairman of Barclays.

Personal life
Pease married Anne Heyworth and they have three children:
Carolyn Thorn Pease, married to John Varley, CEO of Barclays from 2004 to 2011
Richard Peter Pease, 4th Baronet, fund manager
Nichola Pease, married to fellow hedge fund manager Crispin Odey

He lived at Hindley House, Stocksfield-on-Tyne, Northumberland, England. Pease died in March 2021 at the age of 98.

References

1922 births
2021 deaths
English bankers
Richard
People educated at Eton College
Baronets in the Baronetage of the United Kingdom
People from Stocksfield